Alaena margaritacea, the Wolkberg Zulu, is a species of Zulu butterfly in the family Lycaenidae. It is endemic to South Africa, where it is only known from grassy slopes adjoining Afromontane forest in the Haenertsburg area of Limpopo near the Wolkberg mountain range.

It is under severe threat from alien tree plantations as only two colonies are known to exist.

The wingspan is 24–27 mm for males and 28–30 mm for females. Adults are on wing from late December to early January. There is one generation per year.

The larvae feed on species of cyanobacteria. Intriguing female behaviour has been observed recently, possibly related to attracting mates or keeping ants away from a food source.

References

External links
Independent Online - "Hope for endangered SA butterfly species"

Alaena
Butterflies described in 1929
Endemic butterflies of South Africa
Taxonomy articles created by Polbot